The First Baptist Church in Newton was founded in 1788.  Its historic building (built 1888) is located at 848 Beacon Street in the village of Newton Centre, in Newton, Massachusetts. On April 15, 1982, it was listed in the National Register of Historic Places.

Affiliations
As an American Baptist Church, all decisions on church matters rest with its own members.  First Baptist Church in Newton is affiliated with the American Baptist Churches USA and a member of The American Baptist Churches of Massachusetts (TABCOM). It also belongs to the Alliance of Baptists and to AWAB, the Association of Welcoming and Affirming Baptists.

History
First Baptist Church in Newton was founded on July 5, 1780, on a site just west 
of the present building.
The present building was constructed in 1888 in the Richardsonian Romanesque architectural style pioneered by Henry Hobson Richardson. The church's architect was John Lyman Faxon.

Famous minister
Samuel Francis Smith, famous as the author of My Country, 'Tis of Thee (also known as America), was minister of the church from 1842 to 1854. The bell tower on the present building was given in his memory and was rededicated as the America bell tower in 1932.

See also
 National Register of Historic Places listings in Newton, Massachusetts

References

External links
 First Baptist Church in Newton website
 The American Baptist Churches of Massachusetts website

National Register of Historic Places in Newton, Massachusetts
Churches on the National Register of Historic Places in Massachusetts
Baptist churches in Massachusetts
Religious organizations established in 1780
Churches completed in 1888
19th-century Baptist churches in the United States
18th-century Baptist churches in the United States
Churches in Newton, Massachusetts
Stone churches in Massachusetts